Source selection criteria describes properties that are crucial for a purchaser when deciding on a supplier. Criteria can be subjective or objective. Individual judgment can be biased, which may require balancing with objective measures. One approach is to identify a list of criteria such as cost and financial stability, assign a weight to each one and to score each vendor on each criterion. Then multiply the score by the weight and sum to get a final score. .

Criteria 
Criteria can be specific to the desired item(s). Sample criteria:
 Total costs (including works and maintenance)
 Ability to finance
 Capability for technical matters
 The distribution of risks
 The shape of business
 Previous works and references
 Providing Warranty

See also 
Vendor bid analysis
Stock selection criterion
Government procurement in the United States

References

External links
 Department of Defense Source Selection Procedures - USTranscom

Procurement